Ross Pierschbacher (born June 5, 1995) is an American football offensive guard for the Detroit Lions of the National Football League (NFL). He played college football at Alabama and was drafted by the Washington Redskins in the fifth round of the 2019 NFL Draft.

College career
Originally committing to Iowa, Pierschbacher changed his commitment to Alabama and enrolled in January 2014. He became a starter at guard as a redshirt freshman and stayed a starter for all four seasons, tallying 57 career starts and playing center as a senior. He was named an All-SEC player in his last three seasons and team captain as a senior.

Professional career

Washington Redskins / Football Team
Pierschbacher was selected by the Washington Redskins in the fifth round (153rd overall) of the 2019 NFL Draft. He was waived on September 5, 2020, and signed to their practice squad the next day. He was elevated to the active roster on November 7 for the team's Week 9 game against the New York Giants and reverted to the practice squad after the game.

Philadelphia Eagles
On December 14, 2020, Pierschbacher was signed off Washington's practice squad by the Philadelphia Eagles.

On August 31, 2021, Pierschbacher was waived by the Eagles and re-signed to the practice squad the next day. He was released on September 9, 2021.

New York Jets
On September 10, 2021, Pierschbacher was signed to the New York Jets practice squad. He signed a reserve/future contract with the Jets on January 10, 2022. He was waived on August 30, 2022.

Detroit Lions
On September 8, 2022, Pierschbacher was signed to the Detroit Lions practice squad. He was promoted to the active roster on December 10.

References

External links

Philadelphia Eagles bio
Alabama Crimson Tide bio

1995 births
Living people
Alabama Crimson Tide football players
American football centers
American football offensive guards
Detroit Lions players
New York Jets players
People from Cedar Falls, Iowa
Philadelphia Eagles players
Players of American football from Iowa
Washington Redskins players
Washington Football Team players